

Completed buildings

Proposed and under construction skyscrapers

Tallest
Latvia

Latvia